Om Prakash Malhotra also known as O.P. Malhotra(died 2013) was a Senior Advocate in the Supreme Court of India, and a distinguished author who brought out the treatise on the Law of Industrial Disputes and authored commentary on the Law & Practice of Arbitration and Conciliation.

Personal life 
Om Prakash Malhotra had his degree education in Lahore University of Punjab and completed his degree in law from Government Law College, Bangalore. His daughter Indu Malhotra is a former Judge of the Supreme Court of India.  He died on 31 January 2013.

Career
Malhotra started his law career started in Bangalore High Court and later practiced in both the Delhi High court and Supreme Court.

Books
 The Law of Industrial Disputes, Volume 1 
He published six editions of this commentary which received wide acclaim.

 The Law and Practice of Arbitration and Conciliation: The Arbitration and Conciliation Act, 1996

References

Year of birth missing
2013 deaths
Senior Advocates in India
Supreme Court of India lawyers
Indian legal writers